Green Line route 724 is a bus service currently operated by Arriva Southern Counties as part of the Green Line Coaches network. It runs on an orbital route round the north and western outskirts of London between Harlow and Heathrow Terminal 5, and is partly funded by airport operator Heathrow Airport Holdings.

History
Route 724 was started by Green Line Coaches (then part of London Transport) on 10 July 1966, on a route from High Wycombe to Romford via North London using AEC Regal coaches. By June 1972 it had been rerouted to start from Staines and serve Heathrow Airport. The sections of route between Staines and Heathrow, and between Harlow and Romford were later dropped.

Route 724 was included in the sale of London Country North West to a management buyout when privatised in January 1988, in turn passing to Luton & District Transport in 1990, British Bus in 1994 and finally the Cowie Group in August 1996. Today it is operated by  Arriva Southern Counties.

In December 1997, a fleet of nine Plaxton Prestige bodied DAF SB220s were purchased, with extra luggage space built in. These were some of the first low-floor buses to operate in the United Kingdom.

These were replaced in August 2006 by nine Mercedes-Benz Citaros. These were the result of a Quality Bus Partnership between Arriva Shires & Essex, BAA and Hertfordshire County Council. These buses seat 39 and also have extra luggage racking. Journey times were also improved.

In March 2008, the route was diverted to serve the new Heathrow Terminal 5. From 19 May, the service was withdrawn from Heathrow Terminal 4, with another new timetable introduced. Short workings on other parts of the route became routes 725 and 726.

In February 2021, the Citaros were replaced by a fleet of 8 Alexander-Dennis Enviro 200MMCs, which were transferred from Arriva Kent Thameside.

In July 2022, part of the batch of ADL Enviro200 MMCs were replaced by Wright Pulsar 2 bodied VDL SB200s transferred from Derby in return for the Enviro200s.

From 24 July 2022, additional early morning, late evening and weekend journeys were introduced in conjunction with the Heathrow Airport Partnership.

Current route

References

External links
Arriva 724 Harlow to London Heathrow Airport
Green Line Coaches website

Bus routes in England
Green Line Coaches routes
Transport in Essex
Transport in Harlow
Transport in Hertfordshire
Transport in the London Borough of Hillingdon
Transport in St Albans
Transport in Watford
724